Ellen Shub (January 1, 1946 - December 18, 2019) was an American photojournalist focusing on human rights and social justice issues.

Early life and education 
Shub was born in New Jersey to Ruth and George Shub. She studied at University of Rochester, Annenberg School for Communication at the University of Pennsylvania, and Carpenter Center for the Visual Arts. Shub earned an M.Ed from the Harvard Graduate School of Education.

Career 
Shub worked as a media producer in television programming in the Boston area before becoming a full-time freelance photojournalist in the 1980s. Shub's photographs appeared feminist newspapers, gay and lesbian newspapers, and cities' weeklies. Shub attended social protests from the early 1970s through 2018 and many of her photographs feature protest signs. Her photographs of protest signs have appeared in The New Yorker, the National Library of Medicine, Our Bodies Ourselves, and Frontiers: A Journal of Women Studies. She has photographed activists such as Frances Crowe, Larry Kramer, the Dalai Lama, and Rosa Parks. At gallery showings, she would juxtapose images of famous people with lesser-known or unknown activists, giving each subject an equal importance or weight.

Shub worked as a grants administrator and photographer for the Institute of Coaching at McLean Hospital in Belmont, Massachusetts during the last decade of her life.

Personal life
Shub and her longtime partner Kathy J. Seltzer had one son.

References

External links
 Personal website

1946 births
American photojournalists
21st-century American photographers
American portrait photographers
Social documentary photographers
21st-century American journalists
LGBT people from New Jersey
American LGBT journalists
Harvard Graduate School of Education alumni
2019 deaths
21st-century American women photographers
Women photojournalists